Johan Frederik Steffensen (28 February 1873, in Copenhagen – 20 December 1961) was a Danish mathematician, statistician, and actuary who did research in the fields of calculus of finite differences and interpolation. He was professor of actuarial science at the University of Copenhagen from 1923 to 1943.  Steffensen's inequality and Steffensen's method (an iterative numerical method) are named after him. He was an Invited Speaker at the 1912 International Congress of Mathematicians (ICM) in Cambridge, England and at the 1924 ICM in Toronto.

Publications

Obituary

References

External links
 Johan Frederik Steffensen papirer (Danish)

1873 births
1961 deaths
Danish mathematicians
Danish statisticians
Danish actuaries